Charles William Harley Hay, 16th Earl of Kinnoull,  (born 20 December 1962), styled Viscount Dupplin until 2013, is a Scottish hereditary peer and non-affiliated member of the House of Lords, serving as Chair of the European Union Committee.

Biography
Viscount Dupplin was educated at Eton College and studied chemistry at Christ Church, Oxford. where he was an open scholar. A qualified barrister, called to the Bar in 1990 (Middle Temple) he has worked for insurance provider Hiscox for 25 years. He also farms in Perthshire.

He succeeded his father as Earl of Kinnoull following the latter's death on 7 June 2013.

The Earl was elected to sit in the House of Lords at a crossbench hereditary peers' by-election on 4 February 2015, following the resignation of Lady Saltoun of Abernethy.

On 19 March 2015, he made his maiden speech in the House of Lords on a report of the Science & Technology Committee. In June 2015 he was appointed to the Select Committee on Social Mobility. In 2016, he served on the Select Committee on the Trade Union Bill. In May 2016 he was appointed to the Select Committee on the European Union and also the Justice Sub-Committee. In September 2019 he became Chair of the European Union Committee, and Principal Deputy Chairman of Committees of the House of Lords; he therefore left the Crossbenches, and became a non-affiliated peer. He has served as a Deputy Speaker since becoming Principal Deputy Chairman of Committees. In January 2022 he was appointed Vice Chair of the UK delegation to the Parliamentary Partnership Assembly, the new joint body between the European and UK Parliaments. As such he is the leader of the House of Lords delegation.

In June 2017 he was promoted to Lt Col and became commanding officer of the Atholl Highlanders.

He has been a member of The Queen's Bodyguard for Scotland (Royal Company of Archers) since 2000.

In January 2018 he was appointed a Deputy Lieutenant of Perth and Kinross.

Family

He is the son of the Arthur Hay, 15th Earl of Kinnoull and Ann (née Lowson), daughter of Sir Denys Lowson, 1st Baronet.

In 2002, he married Clare, daughter of the circuit judge William Hamilton Crawford, QC, and his wife, Marilyn Jean Colville. The couple have four children:
Lady Alice Hay (b. 25 Sep 2003)
Lady Catriona Hay (b. 25 Sep 2003)
Lady Auriol Hay (b. 15 Mar 2007)
William Hay, Viscount Dupplin (b. 24 Jun 2011)

Charity

The earl serves as president of the Royal Caledonian Ball Trust, which organises an annual ball to benefit Scottish charities. He is the chairman of the Red Squirrel Survival Trust, a wildlife conservation trust. He is also the chair of Culture Perth & Kinross, which is a Trust running the museums and libraries.

References

External links
Biography at Parliament.co.uk

1962 births
Living people
People educated at Eton College
Alumni of Christ Church, Oxford
Crossbench hereditary peers
16
Hereditary peers elected under the House of Lords Act 1999